David Austin (born David Mortimer) is a British singer and songwriter, who released the single "Turn to Gold", co-written with George Michael in 1984. It reached No. 68 in the UK Singles Chart. The single featured backing vocals from George Michael, who called Austin his best friend in the documentary film, A Different Story.

His follow-up single, "This Boy Loves The Sun", was released in the late summer of 1984 but did not chart.

A third single, "Love While You Can" was released only in Japan. This also featured uncredited vocals by George Michael.

Formerly busking partners, Austin and Michael's joint work included the download-only single "John and Elvis Are Dead", their biggest hit "You Have Been Loved" and "Look at Your Hands" from the album Faith. "December Song (I Dreamed of Christmas)" was a Christmas single released by George Michael and David Austin together on 14 December 2009.

He appears as a guitarist in Wham!'s video for the song "The Edge of Heaven".

References

Sources

British songwriters
British record producers
British pop singers
British male singers
Living people
Year of birth missing (living people)
Boogie Box High members
British male songwriters